Smarte Carte Inc. (stylized as smartecarte) is a global company providing products and services to the travel and leisure industry. Smarte Carte specializes in luggage carts and trolleys, wheelchairs, electronic lockers, commercial strollers, and massage chairs, as well as airport services such as baggage storage, baggage wrap, lost property, Mail N’ Fly, porter services, and more. 

Operating in more than 2,500 locations around the world, its products and services are primarily found in airports, shopping centers, theme and water parks, ski resorts, and fitness centers. 

The company is owned by 3I, an investment firm based in London, the United Kingdom that focuses on mid-market private equity and infrastructure.

Origin & History 
In 1967, Jim Muellner was commissioned to design and build one of the first self-serve luggage cart vending machines. In 1970, Smarte Carte Inc was established and started its first operations in Salt Lake City, Minneapolis, and Los Angeles. Through long-term customer contracts, they have sustained market leadership in airport baggage carts and other vending equipment and expanded into international markets in the 1980s. In 1992, the company recognized the increasing concern with security at airports and formed Smarte Carte Inc,  to develop and grow the locker business. The company’s success in airport baggage cart management encouraged it to extend operations into shopping malls across the country as well. In 2008, with the purchase of First Class Seats and Sit Back & Relax, they entered into the massage chair business, making them the largest provider of vending massage chair services in the United States. They expanded their business further in 2018 by purchasing Aviation Mobility and entering the wheelchair market.

Headquarters 
Smarte Carte’s corporate and North American headquarters are located in White Bear Lake, Minnesota, United States.  Additional regional headquarters are located in Australia and the United Kingdom.

Operations 

Smarte Carte Inc. operates products and services in the United States, Canada, United Kingdom, Sweden, Australia, New Zealand, and Singapore.

Products and Services 
•	Luggage carts and operations at airports and major bus/rail stations. 
•	Wheelchairs at airports and shopping centers. 
•	Long-term baggage storage, baggage wrapping, lost property and Mail N’ Fly and other services at airports, malls, and major bus/rail stations. 
•	Electronic lockers and operations at amusement/theme parks, indoor and outdoor water parks, ski resorts, entertainment centers, shopping centers, and transportation centers. 
•	Strollers and operations at shopping centers, amusement/theme parks, and zoos. 
•	Massage chairs at airports, malls, gyms, transportation centers, and family entertainment centers.

Acquisitions 
Smarte Carte has acquired several companies over the course of its history including Sit Back & Relax and First Class Seats in 2008 (Massage Chairs), Central Specialties LTD in 2012 (Strollers), Bagport in 2016 (Carts & Services), Aviation Mobility in 2018 (Wheelchairs), and Feel Good Chairs (Massage Chairs) in 2019.

References

External links 
 

Companies based in White Bear Lake, Minnesota